Statistics of the Scottish Football League in season 1954–55.

Scottish League Division A

Scottish League Division B

See also
1954–55 in Scottish football

References

 
Scottish Football League seasons